Castleton Cricket Club Ground was a cricket ground in Rochdale, Lancashire, England.  The first recorded match on the ground was in 1872, when Castleton played a team called An Eleven.

In 1876, the ground held its only first-class match when Lancashire played Kent.

The final recorded match on the ground came in 1891 when Castleton played Burnley.  The ground was later required for building and built over.  The ground was located to the south Sparth Bottoms Road, an area which is today covered by industrial units following the closure of the ground in 1965.

References

External links
Castleton Cricket Club Ground on CricketArchive
Castleton Cricket Club Ground on Cricinfo

Defunct cricket grounds in England
Buildings and structures in Rochdale
Sport in Rochdale
Cricket grounds in Greater Manchester
Defunct sports venues in Greater Manchester
Sports venues completed in 1872